Satyrocaris is an extinct genus of prawn in the family Penaeidae that existed during the Triassic in what is now Italy. It was described by Garassino and Teruzzi in 1993, and the type species is Satyrocaris cristatus.

References

External links
 Satyrocaris at the Paleobiology Database

Penaeidae
Triassic crustaceans
Fossil taxa described in 1993
Fossils of Italy